Fátima Albuquerque is a journalist and documentary filmmaker from Mozambique. She was one of the first Mozambican women to direct films in the 1980s. Her documentaries demonstrate the broad range of documentary filmmaking in Mozambique.

After working on news items for Kuxa Kanema, Albuquerque made her first documentary, on street children in Mozambique.

Films
 Lo ABC da nova vida [ABC of the new life], 1985
 As nossas flores [Our flowers], 1986
 Le Son c'est la vie [The sound is life], 1987
 Entre a dor e esperanca [Between pain and hope], 1987
 No meu pais existe uma guerra [In my country there is a war], 1989

References

Living people
Year of birth missing (living people)
Mozambican journalists
Mozambican film directors
Documentary film directors
Mozambican women film directors